Barbara Joy Stewart (born 1952) is a former New Zealand politician. She is a member of the New Zealand First party.

Early life
Stewart was born in Wairoa in 1952. She obtained a BEd and a Postgraduate Diploma in Management Studies, both from the University of Waikato. Before entering politics, she was a teacher and a company training officer.

Political career
Stewart was initially a member of the National Party and acted as secretary for the Feilding branch 1987–90.

Member of Parliament

Stewart was elected to Parliament in the 2002 election as a list MP, having been ranked sixth on the New Zealand First party list. In 2006, she introduced a Member's bill to Parliament to reduce the size of the New Zealand House of Representatives from 120 members to 100 members. The bill passed its first reading 61 votes to 60 on 16 March 2006, but was defeated at its Second Reading on 8 November 2006.

In the 2008 general election Stewart was fifth on the New Zealand First list, but the party lost all its parliamentary seats, winning no electorates and polling below the 5% threshold.

At the 2011 election Stewart was re-elected to Parliament following a resurgence in the New Zealand First vote, where she had been ranked fifth on the party list. Stewart had stood in the Waikato seat but was unsuccessful in defeating Lindsay Tisch, the incumbent National Party of New Zealand MP. Stewart was elected whip by the new NZ First caucus following the 2011 election and remained in this role following her re-election in 2014.

In 2013, Stewart voted against the Marriage Amendment Bill, which aims to permit same sex marriage in New Zealand, with all of her follow New Zealand first MPs.

Stewart announced that, following the death of her husband, she would not stand for re-election in 2017.

References

New Zealand First MPs
New Zealand educators
University of Waikato alumni
Women members of the New Zealand House of Representatives
Living people
New Zealand list MPs
1952 births
People from Wairoa
Members of the New Zealand House of Representatives
Unsuccessful candidates in the 2008 New Zealand general election
New Zealand National Party politicians
21st-century New Zealand politicians
21st-century New Zealand women politicians